Albatross Island is an island  southeast of Cape Buller, lying in the Bay of Isles, South Georgia. Charted in 1912–13 by Robert Cushman Murphy, American naturalist aboard the brig Daisy, who gave this name because he observed albatrosses there. The eastern headland of the island is called The Pricker, a name which first appeared on a 1931 British Admiralty chart.

The island is rat-free and there is a breeding population of South Georgia pipits here, along with wandering albatrosses and giant petrels.

The island has been designated by the South Georgia Government as a Specially Protected Area, and has been closed to visitors since 2004, to protect vulnerable habitat from trampling.

See also 
 List of Antarctic and sub-Antarctic islands

References

Islands of South Georgia